The Ministry of Agriculture and Fisheries (MoAF) is a government ministry of Jamaica. Its head office is in Kingston.

References

External links

 Official Jamaican Ministry of Agriculture and Fisheries (MoAF) website

Ministries and agencies of the government of Jamaica
Jamaica
Jamaica
Natural resources in North America
Agricultural organisations based in Jamaica